may refer to:
 Gendai, a modern aesthetic movement in haiku
 Gendai budō, Japanese martial arts established after the 1860s
 GameSalad (company), formerly Gendai Games, an American computer software company
 Shūkan Gendai, a Japanese magazine

See also
 Museum of Contemporary Art, Tokyo